Rose Thomas (born 29 November 1988) is a French rugby sevens player. She was selected as a member of the France women's national rugby sevens team to the 2016 Summer Olympics. She made the last try in the second round of the 2015 Rugby Europe Women's Sevens Championships to help France beat Spain 20-0 and qualify for the Olympics.

References

External links 
 

1988 births
Living people
Female rugby sevens players
Rugby sevens players at the 2016 Summer Olympics
French female rugby union players
Olympic rugby sevens players of France
France international rugby sevens players
France international women's rugby sevens players